The 2015 Women's Six Nations Championship, also known as the 2015 RBS Women's Six Nations due to the tournament's sponsorship by the Royal Bank of Scotland, was the 14th series of the Women's Six Nations Championship, an annual women's rugby union competition between six European rugby union national teams. Matches were held in February and March 2015, on the same weekends as the men's tournament, if not always the same day.

The championship was contested by England, France, Ireland, Italy, Scotland and Wales. Ireland won the championship on a points difference tie-break from France, after both teams had won four of their five matches; it was Ireland's second title in three seasons. Ireland had to win their final game, against Scotland, by a margin of 27 points or more to win the title and achieved this with victory by 73 points to 3. This was also the first time Italy finished in a position above 4th place in the Six Nations, whether men's or women's, and the first time Italy had denied a team a Grand Slam. As in 2013, England focused on the Sevens World Series circuit in order to qualify a Great Britain team for the 2016 Rio Olympics, so there young and inexperienced squad were missing many front-line players.

Table

Fixtures and results

Week 1

Assistant referees:
Maria Beatrice Benvenuti (Italy)
Clara Munarini (Italy)
Assessor:
n/a

Assistant referees:
n/a
n/a
Assessor:
n/a

Assistant referees:
Jamie Morgan (Wales)
Alun Emmanuel (Wales)
Assessor:
n/a

Week 2

Assistant referees:
Helen O'Reilly (Ireland)
Dermot Blake (Ireland)
Assessor:
n/a

Assistant referees:
Alex Pratt (Scotland)
Alexandra Gordon-Smith (Scotland)
Assessor:
n/a

Assistant referees:
Sara Cox (England)
Nikki O'Donnell (England)
Assessor:
n/a

Week 3

Assistant referees:
Joy Neville (Ireland)
John Carvill (Ireland)
Assessor:
n/a

Assistant referees:
Christine Hanizet (France)
Marie Lematte (France)
Assessor:
n/a

Assistant referees:
Mhairi Hay (Scotland)
Kelly Mitchell (Scotland)
Assessor:
n/a

Week 4

Assistant referees:
Sarah Toll
Matthew Daubney
Assessor:
Trevor Fisher

Assistant referees:
Barbara Guastini (Italy)
Francesca Giuliani (Italy)
Assessor:
n/a

Assistant referees:
Stuart Kibble (Wales)
Steff Edwards (Wales)
Assessor:
n/a

Week 5

Assistant referees:
Clara Munarini (Italy)
Maria Giovanna Pacifico (Italy)
Assessor:
n/a

Assistant referees:
Sara Cox (England)
Tracey Pettingale (England)
Assessor:
n/a

Assistant referees:
Alex Pratt (Scotland)
Mhairi Hay (Scotland)
Assessor:
n/a

Notes

External links
The official RBS Six Nations Site

2015
2015 rugby union tournaments for national teams
2014–15 in Irish rugby union
2014–15 in English rugby union
2014–15 in Welsh rugby union
2014–15 in Scottish rugby union
2014–15 in French rugby union
2014–15 in Italian rugby union
2014–15 in European women's rugby union
rugby union
rugby union
rugby union
rugby union
rugby union
Women
rugby union
Women's Six Nations
Women's Six Nations